Allacerops is an extinct genus of odd-toed ungulate belong to the rhinoceros-like family Eggysodontidae. It was a small, ground-dwelling browser, and fossils have been found in Oligocene deposits throughout Central and East Asia.

Allacerops was synonymized with Eggysodon by Heissig (1989), but is now considered a distinct genus. Unaware that Wood (1932) made turgaica the type species of Allacerops, Reshetov et al. (1993) erected Tenisia for "Epiaceratherium" turgaica. Tenisia, however, was already in use for a brachiopod, so Spassov (1994) erected Teniseggysodon as a replacement. In any case, Qiu et al. (1999) recognized Teniseggysodon a junior objective synonym of Allacerops as both were based on the same type species.

References

Oligocene rhinoceroses
Oligocene mammals of Asia
Prehistoric mammal genera